Teutoburg may refer to:

 The Teutoburg Forest, a range of low, forested mountains in the German states of Lower Saxony and North Rhine-Westphalia.
 The Battle of the Teutoburg Forest fought there in AD 9 between Germanic tribes and the Roman Empire.